Hugh Gregg (November 22, 1917September 24, 2003) was an American businessman and politician who served as the 68th governor of New Hampshire from 1953 to 1955, and was the youngest person ever elected to that office. He is the father of former U.S. Senator, former governor, and former U.S. Congressman Judd Gregg of New Hampshire.

Life and career
A native of Nashua, New Hampshire, Gregg was the son of Margaret Prentiss (Richardson) and Harry Alan Gregg. He attended Phillips Exeter Academy.  He graduated from Yale University in 1939 and Harvard Law School in 1942, after which he returned to Nashua and started a law practice. During World War II and the Korean War, he served as in the U.S. Army Counterintelligence Corps.

A Republican, he was elected in 1947 as a city alderman, and was subsequently elected mayor in 1950, a term cut short because of military duty.  He served again in Army Counterintelligence (1950–1952) during the Korean War.  In 1952, he was elected as governor of New Hampshire.

Gregg was also a local businessman involved with the family mill-working business. He was instrumental in setting up the Nashua Foundation, which helped the city recover from the loss of textile mills in the 1950s, by recruiting new industry, including defense electronics firms and, later, Digital Equipment Corp.

In later years, Gregg was best known for his defense of New Hampshire's first-in-the-nation presidential primary, as well as his contention that the Republican Party started in this state.

Gregg was known for a sense of humor, reflected in a small hardback book he published, titled All I learned about politics, by Hugh Gregg. All of its pages are blank.

References

1917 births
2003 deaths
Republican Party governors of New Hampshire
Mayors of Nashua, New Hampshire
United States Army officers
American Congregationalists
Phillips Exeter Academy alumni
Yale University alumni
Harvard Law School alumni
Politicians from Nashua, New Hampshire
20th-century American politicians